Sapoá River (Spanish: Rio Sapoá) is a river of Costa Rica. With headwaters in the Guanacaste National Park, it flows north and crosses into Nicaragua. It empties into Lake Nicaragua.

References

Rivers of Costa Rica
Rivers of Nicaragua
International rivers of North America